Berka/Werra is a former Verwaltungsgemeinschaft in the district Wartburgkreis in Thuringia, Germany. The seat of the Verwaltungsgemeinschaft was in Berka/Werra. It was disbanded in January 2019, when its municipalities were merged into the new town Werra-Suhl-Tal.

The Verwaltungsgemeinschaft Berka/Werra consisted of the following municipalities:

 Berka/Werra 
 Dankmarshausen 
 Dippach 
 Großensee

References

Former Verwaltungsgemeinschaften in Thuringia